Tsukamurella serpentis is a bacterium from the genus of Tsukamurella which has been isolated from the mouth of the snake Naja atra from the Queen Mary Hospital in Hong Kong.

References 

Mycobacteriales
Bacteria described in 2016